Country Meets the Blues is an album of jazz interpretations of country music and blues tunes performed by the Ramsey Lewis' Trio which was recorded in 1962 and released on the Argo label.

Reception

Allmusic awarded the album 4 stars.

Track listing
 "Your Cheatin' Heart" (Hank Williams) - 2:59  
 "St. Louis Blues" (W. C. Handy) - 3:07  
 "Blueberry Hill" (Al Lewis, Vincent Rose, Larry Stock) - 2:43  
 "Country Meets the Blues" - (Ramsey Lewis) 2:27  
 "Memphis in June" (Hoagy Carmichael, Paul Francis Webster) - 3:05  
 "High Noon" (Dimitri Tiomkin, Ned Washington) - 4:46  
 "I Need You So" (Ivory Joe Hunter) - 3:21  
 "I Just Want to Make Love to You" (Willie Dixon) - 2:45  
 "Tangleweed 'Round My Heart" (Roy Kelley, Forrest Wyatt) - 3:24  
 "My Bucket's Got a Hole in It" (Clarence Williams) - 1:56

Personnel 
Ramsey Lewis - piano
El Dee Young - bass
Issac "Red" Holt - drums
String section arranged by Lew Douglas
Reeds arranged by Oliver Nelson

References 

1962 albums
Ramsey Lewis albums
Argo Records albums
Albums produced by Ralph Bass
Albums arranged by Oliver Nelson